The aster miner bee (Andrena asteris) is a species of miner bee in the family Andrenidae. It is found in North America.

References

Further reading

External links

 

asteris
Articles created by Qbugbot
Insects described in 1891